Lansford is a county-border borough (town) in Carbon County, Pennsylvania, United States. It is part of Northeastern Pennsylvania.

The whole valley was owned and subdivided into separate lots by the historically important Lehigh Coal & Navigation Company, locally called the Old Company, which likely settled some structures on the lands by 1827. 

Lansford grew with the development of local anthracite coal mines and was named after Asa Lansford Foster, who was an advocate for merging the small patch towns that developed in the area surrounding the anthracite coal mines.  

The population was 3,941 at the 2010 census, a steep decline from a high of 9,632 at the 1930 census common to many mining towns in Northeastern Pennsylvania.

History
Lansford's first school was opened in 1847 on Abbott Street. Lansford's first church, the Welsh Congregational, was built in 1850 and still stands today on West Abbott Street.

The old No. 9 Mine and Museum in Lansford, a deep mine which operated from 1855 to 1972, is now open as a tourist attraction offering tours of the mine and a wealth of information on local mining history.  A museum occupying the mine's former Wash Shanty building on the site displays a large collection of mining artifacts.

One of the local mine bosses, John P. Jones, was murdered in Lansford, reportedly in connection with labor union strife, attributed to members of a secret society known as the Molly Maguires, many of whom were put on trial and hanged in Carbon and Schuylkill Counties during the mid- to late 1870s.

Lansford was the home of the first Commercial Cable Television system in the United States.

The Lansford Historic District was added to the National Register of Historic Places in 2012.

Geography
The town shares the border of Carbon and Schuylkill County with the abutting neighboring community of Coaldale, which is de facto, a suburban bedroom neighborhood. Lansford is 1 mile north of Summit Hill (where the first anthracite deposits mined by the Lehigh Coal Company were discovered in the 1780s); 10 miles west of Lehighton, and 6 miles northeast of Tamaqua. Lansford's elevation is 1145 feet above sea level. It is also 27 miles northwest of Allentown and 9 miles south of Hazleton. It is located on the northwestern fringe of the Lehigh Valley and is at the southern end of the Coal Region and the Pocono Mountains.

Lansford sits on the north slope of Pisgah Mountain above and along the south bank of the Panther Creek tributary of the Little Schuylkill River, athwart US-209 west of Jim Thorpe, Nesquehoning, and the eastern extent of the  Lehigh-Schuylkill drainage divide, down slope and below historic Summit Hill and east of abutting Coaldale and Tamaqua, Pennsylvania, both farther downstream and west.

Hugh Vrablic is the Mayor of Lansford and is assisted by a council. The town also has a fire department and a police force.

Lansford is part of the Panther Valley School District and is the home of their newly remodeled football stadium and walking track.

Transportation

U.S. Route 209 is the main highway serving Lansford. It follows Patterson Street along a southwest-northeast alignment through the center of town. Pennsylvania Route 902 begins at US 209 and heads southeastward along Spring Garden Street.

Demographics

As of the census of 2000, there were 4,230 people, 1,878 households, and 1,098 families residing in the borough. The population density was 2,710.0 people per square mile (1,046.9/km²). There were 2,228 housing units at an average density of 1,427.4 per square mile (551.4/km²). The racial makeup of the borough was 98.18% White, 0.35% African American, 0.07% Native American, 0.31% Asian, 0.07% Pacific Islander, 0.28% from other races, and 0.73% from two or more races. Hispanic or Latino people of any race were 1.42% of the population.

There were 1,878 households, out of which 24.6% had children under the age of 18 living with them, 38.4% were married couples living together, 14.9% had a female householder with no husband present, and 41.5% were non-families. 37.7% of all households were made up of individuals, and 23.4% had someone living alone who was 65 years of age or older. The average household size was 2.23 and the average family size was 2.92.

In the borough the population was spread out, with 22.5% under the age of 18, 7.3% from 18 to 24, 25.6% from 25 to 44, 19.1% from 45 to 64, and 25.5% who were 65 years of age or older. The median age was 41 years. For every 100 females, there were 84.1 males. For every 100 females age 18 and over, there were 80.2 males.

The median income for a household in the borough was $27,478, and the median income for a family was $37,773. Males had a median income of $30,405 versus $22,255 for females. The per capita income for the borough was $14,347. About 10.9% of families and 14.3% of the population were below the poverty line, including 20.5% of those under age 18 and 10.4% of those age 65 or over.

Media 
WLSH is a locally-owned 5,000-watt station at 1410 on the AM dial which signed-on December 24, 1952. The call letters stand for Lansford and neighboring
Summit Hill.

Notes

References

External links

 Official borough website
 
 
 Benjamin Bloom (1913–99), American educational theorist and professor of education

1845 establishments in Pennsylvania
Boroughs in Carbon County, Pennsylvania
Municipalities of the Anthracite Coal Region of Pennsylvania
Populated places established in 1845